Çatalçam may refer to the following places in Turkey:

 Çatalçam, Amasya
 Çatalçam, Bayramiç
 Çatalçam, Dargecit
 Çatalçam, Dursunbey
 Çatalçam, Kastamonu
 Çatalçam, Kaynaşlı
 Çatalçam, Refahiye
 Çatalçam, Tufanbeyli